Snctm is an American nightclub and sex club founded in 2013 in Beverly Hills, California. It was founded by Damon Lawner and modeled after the film Eyes Wide Shut. It has been called the world's most exclusive sex club. To join or attend an event a guest must complete an application and submit photos for approval.

Snctm events are black-tie masquerade parties — male attendees are required to wear tuxedos and female attendees lingerie or cocktail dresses.

Snctm has hosted private sex parties in Kyiv, Miami, the Hamptons, and Moscow. Snctm's sex parties in the United States have been attended by such celebrities as comedian Bill Maher and actor Gwyneth Paltrow.

The club was the subject of the Showtime unscripted docuseries Naked SNCTM.

In August 2019 the club was sold to an anonymous investment group that refers to itself as the Circle. In March 2020 Snctm closed due to the COVID-19 pandemic, but subsequently reopened at more limited capacity and with increased safety measures. The club hosted a Black Death-themed Halloween party in New York amidst the pandemic.

In November 2021 the club was featured in a segment on The Late Show With Stephen Colbert.

References

External links

Sex_businesses
Group sex
Nightclubs in California
Swinging (sexual practice)
Companies based in Beverly Hills, California
2013 establishments in California